Axel Gudbrand Blytt (19 May 1843 – 18 July 1898) was a Norwegian professor, botanist and geologist. He was the author of a number of books regarding the flora of Norway.  Today he is most associated with his role in developing the Blytt-Sernander theory of climatic change.

Biography
Blytt was born  in Kristiania (now Oslo), Norway. He was the son of Matthias Numsen Blytt (1789–1862) and Ambrosia Henriksen (1822–1900). His father was a noted professor of botany at The Royal Frederick University (now University of Oslo).  He graduated Examen artium  from Royal Frederick University in 1860. After the death of his father in 1862, he continued his father's work with Norwegian flora. Axel Blytt served with the Christiania Herbarium at the University of Oslo from 1865, first as a conservator, then from 1880 as a professor. In 1869, he was awarded the Crown Prince's gold medal (Kronprinsens gullmedalje). 

Based partly on his father's work, he published  Norges Flora in two volumes  during 1874 and 1876.  His work, Essay on the Immigration of Norwegian Flora (1876)  was read by and influenced Charles Darwin.
He died in Oslo during 1898. His work Haandbog i Norges flora was completed and published posthumously  by botanist   Ove Dahl during 1906.

Legacy
Blyttberget, a high crag southeast of Nordlaguna on the Norwegian island of Jan Mayen, is named for him.  The German botanist Wilhelm Schimper named several mosses after him as well.

The remaining existent specimens Blytt collected on his studies are held at the Botanical Museum of the University of Oslo. The Buffalo Museum of Science in Buffalo, New York also holds a collection of specimens attributed to a collector identified as "Blytt", who is likely Axel Blytt. This is evidenced by Charles Peck, the New York State Botanist from 1883 to 1913, in his 1872 Report of the Botanist to the New York Senate. Peck wrote that he had received 22 specimens of lichens from the University of Norway, Christiana (Oslo), Norway, for the New York State Cabinet. There is also a mention of Blytt in correspondence between the Swiss botanist Leo Lesquereux and George William Clinton, then President of the Buffalo Museum of Natural Sciences, regarding specimens and a visit to the Buffalo Museum by Lesquereux. Though the existing correspondence only provides Lesquereux's letters, he refers to Blytt as "a good Norwegian Botanist I do not know his address in any other way than as you write it. Christiania Norway."

Selected works
Botanisk Reise i Valders og de tilgrændsende Egne, 1864   
 Om Vegetationsforholdene ved Sognefjorden, 1869
Vore beste spiselige Soparter, 1869
Christiania Omegns Phanerogamer og Bregner, 1870
Spiselige Lavarter, 1870
Norges Flora. Andel og tredie Del, 2 volumes, 1874–76
Haandbog i Norges flora (completed and published by Ove Dahl), 1906

Related reading
The Probable Cause of the Displacement of Beach-lines: An Attempt to Compute Geological Epochs (1889)

References

1843 births
1898 deaths
Scientists from Oslo
University of Oslo alumni
Academic staff of the University of Oslo
Norwegian educators
Norwegian geologists
19th-century Norwegian botanists
Botanists with author abbreviations
Members of the Norwegian Academy of Science and Letters